The Portrait of a Gentleman with a Lion Paw is an oil-on-canvas painting  by the Italian High Renaissance painter Lorenzo Lotto, dating c. 1524–1525. It is housed in the Kunsthistorisches Museum, Vienna, Austria.

History
The work's history can be traced from 1679, when it was listed in the collection of Archduke Leopold Wilhelm of Austria. Neither the identity of the sitter nor the date the portrait was painted is known, although the work has been assigned to Lotto's early Venetian period, when he carried out commissions for several private patrons.

Description
The work shows a gentleman wearing a rich, fur-lined black coat. He stands in front of a rich red and a green textile background and shows us a gilt lion's paw. His right hand, in a  gesture typical of Lotto, touches his heart, showing two valuable rings. The composition and the colors show the influence of Titian, then the most respected painter in Venice.

The symbolic meaning of the lion's paw is not clear. It could be an allusion to the subject's name, perhaps Leonino Brambati of Bergamo, or a member of the Venetian Zatta family (zatta, in Venetian dialect, means "paw"). It has also been suggested that the lion's paw has masonic significance.

See also
Portrait of Andrea Odoni

Sources

External links
Museum webpage 

1527 paintings
Paintings in the collection of the Kunsthistorisches Museum
Paintings in the collection of the Archduke Leopold Wilhelm of Austria
Gentleman Lion Paw